Skye Borgman is an American film director and cinematographer. She is best known for her work on the documentary film Abducted in Plain Sight.

Life and career
Skye was born in Klamath Falls, Oregon. She was graduated from the Cornish College of the Arts and University of Southern California. She is a professor at the University of Southern California.

Skye's debut documentary film Junk Dreams, won the Best Documentary Award at the Bare Bones International Film Festival and Accolade Award of Excellence. Her most recent documentary film is Abducted in Plain Sight, also known as Forever B produced by Top Knot Films. The film premiered at the Mammoth Lakes Film Festival and was later released by Netflix in 2019. It also won the award for Best Documentary film at the Newport Beach Film Festival and Phoenix Film Festival.

Filmography

As cinematographer
 2003 - Unsyncables at Any Age
 2007 - Schooled
 2007 - The Cellar Door
 2007 - Underbelly
 2008 - Raices torcidas
 2008 - Fear House
 2008 - Outrighteous
 2010 - Junk Dreams
 2010 - The Pathetically Cheap Adventures of Xtra-Man
 2012 - Nothing Like Chocolate
 2013 - The Resurrection of Malchus
 2014 - Quiet Riot
 2015 - Kevin Memorie
 2015 - How Randy Rhoads Met Ozzy 
 2015 - Bondage
 2017 - Abducted in Plain Sight
 2018 - We Are Galapagos

Awards and nominations

References

External links

 

Living people
American women film directors
American cinematographers
American women cinematographers
Year of birth missing (living people)
21st-century American women